Mahmutlu can refer to:

 Mahmutlu, Akseki
 Mahmutlu, Buldan
 Mahmutlu, Erzincan
 Mahmutlu, Karakoçan
 Mahmutlu, Merzifon
 Mahmutlu, Saimbeyli